Fort Pierre National Grassland is a United States National Grassland in central South Dakota, south of the capital city Pierre and its neighbor Fort Pierre. In descending order of area it lies in parts of Lyman, Stanley, and Jones counties. Part of the movie Dances with Wolves was filmed there. It is managed by the U.S. Forest Service together with the Nebraska and Samuel R. McKelvie National Forests and the Buffalo Gap and Oglala National Grasslands from common offices in Chadron, Nebraska. There is a local ranger district office located in Pierre.

References

External links
 Fort Pierre National Grassland - Nebraska National Forests and Grasslands

Protected areas of Jones County, South Dakota
Protected areas of Lyman County, South Dakota
National Grasslands of the United States
Protected areas of Stanley County, South Dakota
Grasslands of South Dakota